VA-152 was an Attack Squadron of the U.S. Navy, nicknamed the Fighting Aces from 1953-1956, the Friendly Squadron or Friendlies from 1957-1968, and the Mavericks thereafter.

The squadron was established as Reserve Fighter Squadron VF-713 sometime in the late 1940s, and called to active duty on 1 February 1951. It was redesignated as VF-152 on 4 February 1953, and finally as VA-152 on 1 August 1958. The squadron was disestablished on 29 January 1971, after twenty years of service.

Operational history
 15 October 1951: The squadron participated in its first combat operations in the Korean War.
 31 December 1951: Squadron aircraft were used for Operation Pin Wheel.
 February 1955: Squadron aircraft flew night surveillance operations supporting the evacuation of Chinese Nationalists from the Tachen Islands during the First Taiwan Straits Crisis.
 March 1958: Due to revolts and unsettled conditions in Indonesia and the concern for the safety of Americans in the country, with VF-152 embarked, departed Hong Kong to operate in the South China Sea.
 September–October 1958: During the Second Taiwan Straits Crisis, with VF-152 embarked, operated in the area of Taiwan.
 January 1961: Due to the crisis in Laos and the capture of strategic positions in the country by the Pathet Lao force, with VA-152 embarked, was directed to operate in the South China Sea.
 11–12 July 1962: The squadron participated in the first carrier flight operations in the Bering Sea since the end of World War II.
 April–December 1964: Squadron personnel, while based at Bien Hoa Air Base, South Vietnam, trained South Vietnamese pilots to fly the A-1.
 6 and 7 November 1965: Commander Gordon H. Smith was awarded the Silver Star for his participation as Flight Leader in directing and assisting in the first night rescue of a downed aviator in enemy territory on 6 November. This was followed by an attempt to rescue another aviator the following day in the same area.
 7 November 1965: Lieutenant Gordon C. Wileen was awarded the Silver Star for his participation in an attempted air rescue of a downed aviator deep in enemy territory.
 13 November 1965: Commander Albert E. Knutson was awarded the Silver Star for his attempt to locate and rescue a downed pilot in enemy territory. During the rescue attempt his aircraft sustained 26 hits.
 26 October 1966: While on Yankee Station and preparing to launch her first strike of the day,  suffered a disastrous fire. The squadron lost two personnel in the fire and the damage to the carrier was so extensive that it returned to the States for repairs.
 16 June 1967 - 31 January 1968:  VA-152 is the second-to-last US Navy attack squadron to fly the single-seat A-1H/J Skyraider in combat, as part of Carrier Air Wing 16 (embarked aboard the Oriskany), during the squadron's and carrier's third combat cruise to Southeast Asia.  VA-152 loses one aircraft and its pilot during this last A-1 cruise, on 15 July 1967.  (VA-25 is the very last USN squadron to fly the A-1H/J in combat, completing its third and final combat cruise in early April 1968, aboard the Coral Sea).

Home port assignments
The squadron was assigned to these home ports, effective on the dates shown:
 NAS Denver – Assigned prior to 1951. Exact date unknown.
 NAS Alameda – 11 Apr 1951
 NAS Moffett Field – 05 Jun 1952
 NAS Alameda – Nov 1963

Aircraft assignment
The squadron first received the following aircraft on the dates shown:
 F4U-4 Corsair – 16 Apr 1951
 FG-1D Corsair – 12 Jun 1952
 F2H-3 Banshee – 3 Oct 1953
 AD-6/AD-1H Skyraider – 05 Feb 1959
 A-1J Skyraider – Dec 1962
 A-4B Skyhawk – Feb 1968
 A-4C Skyhawk – Feb 1968
 A-4E Skyhawk – May 1969

See also
 List of squadrons in the Dictionary of American Naval Aviation Squadrons
 Attack aircraft
 List of inactive United States Navy aircraft squadrons
 History of the United States Navy

References

External links

Attack squadrons of the United States Navy
Wikipedia articles incorporating text from the Dictionary of American Naval Aviation Squadrons